Fabrice Asencio (1 August 1966 – 4 October 2016) was a French professional footballer who played as a defender. During his career, he made 202 appearances and scored one goal in the Division 2.

Post-playing career 
After his playing career, Asencio became a scout. After working for Arles-Avignon, he began working for Evian. He later became an assistant manager to Pascal Dupraz at the club.

Notes

References 

1966 births
2016 deaths
People from Tulle
Sportspeople from Corrèze
French footballers
Association football defenders

INF Vichy players
Limoges FC players
USL Dunkerque players
ASOA Valence players
SO Châtellerault players
Wasquehal Football players
French Division 3 (1971–1993) players
Ligue 2 players
Championnat National players
Association football coaches
Association football scouts
AC Arlésien non-playing staff
Thonon Evian Grand Genève F.C. non-playing staff
Footballers from Nouvelle-Aquitaine